Bartolomeo Eustachi (c. 1500–1510 – 27 August 1574), also known by his Latin name of Bartholomaeus Eustachius, was an Italian anatomist and one of the founders of the science of human anatomy.

Biography
Bartolomeo was born in San Severino in the province of Ancona, where his father, Marinao Eustachius, was an wealthy and prominent physician. Bartolomeo received the required, broad humanistic education typical for that time, and then studied Medicine at the Archiginnasio della Sapienza in Rome. He was also well versed in Hebrew, Arabic, and Greek languages, which gave him access to the original medical treatises written in those languages. As a physician, Eustachius enjoyed great prestige among the upper classes, having among his patients the Duke of Urbino, the Cardinal della Rovero, and the Duke of Terranova. He became a member of the Medical College of Rome and was appointed in 1549, Professor of Anatomy at the Papal College, the Archiginnasio dell Sapienza. Soon he obtained papal dispensation allowing him to dissect cadavers from patients from the Santo Spirito Hospital.

Bartolomeo Eustachio (writing with the Latin surname Eustacius) wrote during 1562 and 1563 a remarkable series of scientific works on the anatomy of the kidney, the hearing apparatus, the teeth and their structure, and the circulatory system including the lower vena cavae and its valves (now known as the Eustachian valve). These works were organized and published as Opscula Anatomica in 1564. 

Eustachius was deeply interested in understanding the anatomical structures of the human body through direct observation instead of accepting the many a Priori theories current among other physicians. His anatomical investigations into the vena caval Eustachian valve, led him its functions was to avoid retrograde blood reflux. He also discovered the thoracic canal. Trying to understand how diseases affected body structures, Eustachius made comparative anatomical analysis between healthy and disease-altered organs (pathological anatomy). working with Pier Matteo Pini, they produced a series of 47 detailed drawings of the studied organs. these series of illustrations, Tabulae Anatomicae Clariviri, were published in 1714.

Eustachio extended the knowledge of the internal ear by rediscovering and describing correctly the Eustachian tube that bears his name.  He is the first to describe the internal and anterior muscles of the malleus and the stapedius, and the complicated figure of the cochlea. He is the first who studied accurately the anatomy of the teeth, and the phenomena of the first and second dentition. Eustachius also discovered the adrenal glands (reported in 1563). His greatest work, which he was unable to publish, is his Anatomical Engravings. These were completed in 1552, nine years after Vesalius had published his magnum opus of De Humani Corporis Fabrica Libri Septem in Basel.

Published in 1714 by Giovanni Maria Lancisi at the expense of Pope Clement XI, and again in 1744 by Cajetan Petrioli, and again in 1744 by Bernhard Siegfried Albinus, and subsequently at Bonn in 1790, the engravings show that Eustachius had dissected with the greatest care and diligence, and taken the utmost pains to give just views of the shape, size, and relative position of the organs of the human body.

The first seven plates illustrate the history of the kidneys and some of the facts relating to the structure of the ear.  The eighth represents the heart, the ramifications of the vena azygos, and the valve of the vena cava, named from the author.  In the seven subsequent plates is given a succession of different views of the viscera of the chest and abdomen.  The seventeenth contains the brain and spinal cord; and the eighteenth more accurate views of the origin, course, and distribution of the nerves than had been given before.  Fourteen plates are devoted to the muscles.

Eustachius did not confine his researches to the study of comparative anatomy.  He attempted to derive the physiology of organs on the basis of their anatomy. He did not restrict himself to gross anatomy: what was too minute for unassisted vision he inspected by means of glasses (early microscopes). Structure that could not be understood in the recent state he unfolded by maceration in different fluids, or rendered more distinct by injection and exsiccation.

He was known as a supporter of the 2nd century AD Ancient Roman anatomist Galen, entering into a public dispute with the eminent contemporary anatomist, Vesalius. Both however made their anatomic observations from dissection of human cadavers.

Eustachius died in Umbria, in 1574, during a trip to meet Cardinal della Rovere.

Works
 Bartolomeo,Eustachi (1564), "Opuscula Anatomica" 
 Bartolomeo Eustachi (1728), Tabulae anatomicae – digital facsimile from the Linda Hall Library

Notes

References
K. Lee Lerner and Brenda Wilmoth Lerner World of Anatomy and Physiology  Vol. 1 
Choulant, L. History and bibliography of anatomic illustration. Trans. and annotated by Mortimer Frank. (New York: Hafner, 1962). pp. 200–204.
Dizionario biografico degli italiani. (Roma: Istituto della Enciclopedia Italiana, 1960- ). Vol. 43, pp. 531–536.
Roberts, K. B. "Eustachius and his anatomical plates." Newsletter of the Canadian Society for the History of Medicine, (1979) Apr.: 9–13.

External links
 Bartholomeo Eustachi: Tabulae anatomicae (Rome, 1783). Selected pages scanned from the original work. Historical Anatomies on the Web. US National Library of Medicine.
 
 Selected images from Tabulae anatomicae From The College of Physicians of Philadelphia Digital Library

Italian anatomists
1574 deaths
16th-century Italian physicians
History of anatomy
Year of birth uncertain